Melinovac is a village in Croatia.

History
During World War II, as part of their genocide targeting ethnic Serbs, the Croatian fascist Ustaše regime killed about 890 Serbs from Melinovac as well as the nearby village of Ličko Petrovo Selo between June and August 1941. The victims were thrown into a pit.

Population

According to the 2011 census, Melinovac had 9 inhabitants.

1991 census

According to the 1991 census, settlement of Melinovac had 43 inhabitants, which were ethnically declared as this:

Austro-hungarian 1910 census

According to the 1910 census, settlement of Melinovac had 337 inhabitants which were linguistically and religiously declared as this:

Literature 

  Savezni zavod za statistiku i evidenciju FNRJ i SFRJ, popis stanovništva 1948, 1953, 1961, 1971, 1981. i 1991. godine.
 Knjiga: "Narodnosni i vjerski sastav stanovništva Hrvatske, 1880-1991: po naseljima, author: Jakov Gelo, izdavač: Državni zavod za statistiku Republike Hrvatske, 1998., ;

References

Populated places in Lika-Senj County